Grzegorz Proksa (born 23 November 1984) is a Polish former professional boxer who competed from 2005 to 2014. He is a two-time former European middleweight champion and a world title challenger.

Professional boxing record

|-
|align="center" colspan=8|29 Wins (21 knockouts, 7 decisions),  4 Losses, 0 Draws
|-
| align="center" style="border-style: none none solid solid; background: #e3e3e3"|Res.
| align="center" style="border-style: none none solid solid; background: #e3e3e3"|Record
| align="center" style="border-style: none none solid solid; background: #e3e3e3"|Opponent
| align="center" style="border-style: none none solid solid; background: #e3e3e3"|Type
| align="center" style="border-style: none none solid solid; background: #e3e3e3"|Rd.,Time
| align="center" style="border-style: none none solid solid; background: #e3e3e3"|Date
| align="center" style="border-style: none none solid solid; background: #e3e3e3"|Location
| align="center" style="border-style: none none solid solid; background: #e3e3e3"|Notes
|-align=center
| Loss
|29–4
|align=left| Maciej Sulęcki
|KO
|7 
|2014-11-08
|align=left| Kraków Arena, Kraków
|
|-align=center
|Loss
|29–3
|align=left| Sergio Mora 
|UD
|10 
|2013-06-28
|align=left| Florida
|
|-align=center
|Win
|29–2
|align=left| Norbert Szekeres 
|UD
|6  
|2013-02-09
|align=left| Belfast
|
|-align=center
|Loss
|28–2
|align=left| Gennady Golovkin
|TKO
| 5 
|2012-09-01		
|align=left| New York City
|align=left|For WBA and IBO middleweight titles.
|-align=center
|Win
|28–1
|align=left| Kerry Hope
|TKO
|8 
|2012-07-07		
|align=left| Yorkshire
|align=left|Won European middleweight title.
|-align=center
|-align=center
|Win
|27–1
|align=left| Rudolf Varga
|TKO
|3 
|2012-05-10		
|align=left| Budapest
|
|-align=center
|Loss
|26–1
|align=left| Kerry Hope
|MD
|12 
|2012-03-17		
|align=left| Yorkshire
|align=left|Lost European middleweight title.
|-align=center
|Win
|26–0
|align=left| Sebastian Sylvester
|RTD
|3 
|2011-10-01		
|align=left| Neubrandenburg
|align=left|Won European middleweight title.
|-align=center
|Win
|25–0
|align=left| Peter Vecsei
|TKO
|2 
|2011-06-23	
|align=left| Budapest
|
|-align=center
|Win
|24–0
|align=left| Pablo Navascues
|KO
|9 
|2011-04-15	
|align=left| Leganés
|align=left|Retained European Union middleweight title.
|-align=center
|Win
|23–0
|align=left| Joe Rea
|KO
|4 
|2011-03-05
|align=left| Yorkshire
|align=left|
|-align=center
|Win
|22–0
|align=left| Theophilus Tetteh
|TKO
|5 
|2010-11-06
|align=left| Newport
|
|-align=center
|Win
|21–0
|align=left| Alex Spitko
|TKO
|4 
|2010-07-09
|align=left| London
|align=left|
|-align=center
|Win
|20–0
|align=left| Tyan Booth
|TKO
|5 
|2010-02-12
|align=left| London
|align=left|Won European Union middleweight title.
|-align=center
|Win
|19–0
|align=left| Paul Buchanan
|TKO
|6 
|2009-11-06
|align=left| Magherafelt
|
|-align=center
|Win
|18–0
|align=left| Jamie Coyle
|TKO
|3 
|2009-06-12
|align=left| Merseyside
|
|-align=center
|Win
|17–0
|align=left| Lee Noble
|TKO
|3 
|2009-03-13
|align=left| Cheshire
|
|-align=center
|Win
|16–0
|align=left| Taz Jones
|TKO
|4 
|2008-12-05
|align=left| Dagenham
|
|-align=center
|Win
|15–0
|align=left| Mihai Macovei
|UD
|6 
|2008-10-10
|align=left| Barleben
| 
|-align=center
|Win
|14–0
|align=left| Jairo Alvarez
|PTS
|6 
|2008-04-12
|align=left| Castlebar
|
|-align=center
|Win
|13–0
|align=left| Andrei Rimer
|UD
|6 
|2007-12-15
|align=left| Dessau-Roßlau
|
|-align=center
|Win
|12–0
|align=left| Gotthard Hinteregger
|TKO
|2 
|2007-10-12
|align=left| Peterlee
|
|-align=center
|Win
|11–0
|align=left| Vitalie Mirza
|TKO
|4 
|2007-07-20
|align=left| Wolverhampton
|align=left|WBC and IBF Youth middleweight titles.
|-align=center
|Win
|10–0
|align=left| Ojay Abrahams
|RTD
|2 
|2007-03-02
|align=left| Neath
|align=left|
|-align=center
|Win
|9–0
|align=left| Steve Conway
|PTS
|6 
|2006-12-15
|align=left| London
|
|-align=center
|Win
|8–0
|align=left| Ignacio Lucero Fraga
|UD
|10 
|2006-10-13
|align=left| Port Talbot
|align=left|Retained WBC and IBF Youth middleweight titles.
|-align=center
|Win
|7–0
|align=left| Ben Hudson
|PTS
|4 
|2006-09-15
|align=left| London
|
|-align=center
|Win
|6–0
|align=left| Kenneth Van Eesvelde
|TKO
|7 
|2006-03-03
|align=left| Hartlepool
|align=left|Won WBC and IBF Youth middleweight titles.
|-align=center
|Win
|5–0
|align=left| Gene Newton
|TKO
|3 
|2006-01-21
|align=left| Las Vegas
|
|-align=center
|Win
|4–0
|align=left| David Kehoe
|TKO
|3 
|2005-09-12
|align=left| Iver Heath
|
|-align=center
|Win
|3–0
|align=left| Surinder Sekhon
|PTS
|4 
|2005-09-09
|align=left| Sheffield
|align=left|
|-align=center
|Win
|2–0
|align=left| Sean Rawley Wilson
|TKO
|2 
|2005-05-07
|align=left| Las Vegas
|
|-align=center
|Win
|1–0
|align=left| Adam Capo
|TKO
|1 
|2005-03-05
|align=left| Las Vegas
|align=left|

References

External links

 

Living people
1984 births
People from Mysłowice
Sportspeople from Silesian Voivodeship
Polish male boxers
Middleweight boxers